The Journal of Cancer is a peer-reviewed open access medical journal covering all areas of cancer research and oncology, published by Ivyspring International Publisher. The editors-in-chief are Yan-Gao Man (Bon Secours Cancer Institute) and Naoto T. Ueno (University of Texas M. D. Anderson Cancer Center). The journal is abstracted and indexed in the Science Citation Index Expanded. The journal is included in the PubMed and PubMed Central.

References

External links 
 

Oncology journals
Open access journals
English-language journals
Ivyspring International Publisher journals
Publications established in 2010
9 times per year journals